Pan is a 2015 American fantasy film directed by Joe Wright and written by Jason Fuchs. The film serves as a prequel to Peter and Wendy from Scottish author J. M. Barrie, which was first staged in 1904, and focuses on an alternative origin story for Peter Pan and Captain Hook. It stars Hugh Jackman as a fictionalized version of Blackbeard, Garrett Hedlund as Hook, Rooney Mara as Tiger Lily, and Levi Miller as Peter Pan.

Pans world premiere was held in London on September 20, 2015, and it was theatrically released in the United States on October 9, 2015, by Warner Bros. Pictures. Pan was a box-office bomb, only grossing $128.4 million against a production budget of $150 million, resulting in significant loss for the studio, and was received negatively by critics, with criticism calling the plot formulaic and the action heavily reliant on CGI. Some also criticized the casting of white actress Rooney Mara as the Native American character Tiger Lily; Mara would later voice regret over her role in the film. Meanwhile, critics also praised the film for the action sequences, performances by Hedlund, Jackman and Miller, and John Powell’s music.

Plot
Newborn Peter is left on the steps of a London orphanage with a mysterious pan flute pendant by his mother Mary. Years later during World War II, upon learning that the abusive Mother Barnabas is hoarding food for herself, Peter and his best friend Nibs are caught trying to steal the food for the orphans. In the process, they find a letter written to Peter by his mother, declaring her love and assuring him they will meet again "in this world or another".

Mother Barnabas summons pirates who kidnap Peter, Nibs and several other orphans. Nibs manages to escape, but Peter is taken aboard a flying pirate ship. Following an aerial battle with several Spitfires, the ship reaches Neverland, where the children are forced to mine for Pixum – crystallized Fairy Dust—for the pirate Blackbeard, who uses the substance to prevent himself from aging. Taken captive by Blackbeard's right-hand man Bishop, Peter meets another miner, James Hook. After insulting Blackbeard's men, Peter is forced to walk the plank over the deep mine, but survives by flying. Blackbeard tells Peter about the native tribe's prophecy of a flying boy who would lead an uprising to kill him, but Peter refuses to believe in "bedtime stories".

Peter joins Hook and his accomplice, Sam "Smee" Smiegel in stealing a flying ship and escaping into the forest. Determined to find his mother, Peter refuses to leave Neverland. They are found by the native chief's daughter Tiger Lily and nearly executed, but Chief Great Little Panther notices Peter's pendant, which is said to belong to their people's greatest hero, the legendary Pan. Using the Memory Tree, Tiger Lily tells Peter that many years ago, when the natives and fairies united against the pirates, the Fairy Prince and Mary, the love of Blackbeard's life, fell in love. When Blackbeard discovered them, the Prince took human form and sacrificed himself to rescue Mary, as fairies can live as humans for only one day. Mary was forced to hide their son Peter in the other world and seek shelter in the Fairy Kingdom. As half-fairy, Peter has the ability to fly but is unable to do so because of his lack of faith.

Fearful of Blackbeard, Smee betrays the natives’ location, and in the ensuing battle Chief Great Little Panther is shot by Blackbeard, who reveals that he killed Mary. Peter is hurt to learn that Tiger Lily lied to him that his mother was still alive, but she explains that he would have walked away from his destiny if he knew the truth.

Peter, Hook, and Tiger Lily escape in a raft to enlist the help of the Fairy Kingdom. They are attacked by a giant crocodile and Peter is nearly eaten before being rescued by the mermaids. Tiger Lily shows Peter a vision of Blackbeard accidentally killing Mary as she defended the Fairy Kingdom, revealing she was a great warrior who trained Tiger Lily herself. Hook leaves on an abandoned ship to find home while Peter and Tiger Lily arrive at the Fairy Kingdom, only to be ambushed by Blackbeard. Planning to use the fairies' vast amount of Pixum to live forever, Blackbeard takes Peter's pendant, the key to the Fairy Kingdom, and opens their gates, launching an attack.

Peter escapes and meets a fairy named Tinker Bell. Hook returns and fights Blackbeard's right-hand man Bishop while Tiger Lily duels Blackbeard, and the ship tips over, sending Hook and Bishop plummeting. Peter conquers his fears and flies to save Hook, then rallies the fairies against the pirates as Peter saves Tiger Lily. Blackbeard and his men are forced into an abyss to their deaths, with only Smee having fled. Peter sees a vision of Mary, who reaffirms him to be Neverland's savior: Peter Pan.

Peter, Tiger Lily and Hook, now captain of the Jolly Roger, return to London to rescue Nibs and the other orphans, who become Peter's crew, the Lost Boys. Hook and Tiger Lily fall somewhat in love, and Peter and Hook reaffirm their friendship, certain nothing will ever go wrong between them.

Cast

 Levi Miller as Peter Pan
 Hugh Jackman as Blackbeard
 Garrett Hedlund as James Hook
 Rooney Mara as Tiger Lily
 Adeel Akhtar as Sam "Smee" Smiegel
 Kathy Burke as Mother Barnabas
 Nonso Anozie as Bishop
 Amanda Seyfried as Mary
 Jack Charles as Chief Great Little Panther
 Lewis MacDougall as Nibs
 Bronson Webb as Steps
 Na Tae-joo as Kwahu
 Cara Delevingne as the mermaids

Production

The script for the film was listed on Hollywood's 2013 Black List. In January 2014, Garrett Hedlund was cast as a younger version of Captain Hook. On January 24, 2014, Jackman was officially cast as the pirate Blackbeard. In February, a casting call was issued for the role of Peter Pan, which went to newcomer Levi Miller in March. In April 2014, Amanda Seyfried was cast. In August 2014, British model Cara Delevingne was chosen to play a mermaid. Rooney Mara was cast as Tiger Lily.

Casting controversy

Mara's casting as Tiger Lily created accucations of racebending due to her being of European ancestry, while Tiger Lily is traditionally portrayed as a Native American. Also considered for the role of Tiger Lily were actresses Lupita Nyong'o and Adèle Exarchopoulos, neither of whom are Native American.

According to critics of the casting there are very few main roles for Native American women in Hollywood, and that the choice not only took one away from a Native American actress, but also perpetuated the invisibility of Native Americans in film. During the film's casting, an article in TheWrap stated that director Joe Wright was trying to create a "very international and multi-racial" world. However, most of the main characters in the film (including the four lead actors) are white. A petition was created in response to the casting to urge Warner Bros. studios to stop casting white actors in roles for people of color. Previous portrayals of the Piccaninny tribe in Peter Pan have been criticized as racist.

Critics of the casting in Pan suggested that Warner Bros. may have wanted to avoid repeating the alleged racism of previous Peter Pan stories by altering the ethnicity of the Piccaninnies rather than stereotypically portraying the source material.

In a February 2016 interview, Mara expressed regret for playing Tiger Lily in Pan saying: "I really hate, hate, hate that I am on that side of the whitewashing conversation. I really do. I don't ever want to be on that side of it again. I can understand why people were upset and frustrated....Do I think all of the four main people in the film should have been white with blonde hair and blue eyes? No. I think there should have been some diversity somewhere."

Filming
On April 28, 2014, the film's principal photography began. Many natural scenes in the film were from Son Doong Cave, Phong Nha-Kẻ Bàng National Park, and Ninh Bình Province in Vietnam, shot with the help of Bangkok-based Indochina Productions. The captured scenes were then graphically edited into the film.

Soundtrack
The film's soundtrack was released in 2015. It was composed by John Powell, and additional music by Anthony Willis, Batu Sener, Paul Mounsey. Dario Marianelli, a frequent collaborator with Wright, had composed a score for the film, but Warner Bros. later replaced him with Powell after test screenings.
Lily Allen wrote two original songs for the movie.

 Track list
 "Smells Like Teen Spirit" – Performed by Hugh Jackman and Cast
 "Blitzkrieg Bop" – Performed by Hugh Jackman and Cast
 "Short Change Hero" – Performed by Capitol Children's Choir & Metro Voices
 "Something's Not Right" – Performed by Lily Allen
 "Little Soldier" – Performed by Lily Allen
 "Irish Blessing" – Performed and Arranged by The African Children's Choir
 All Music – Composed and written by John Powell

Release

On December 12, 2013, Warner Bros. set for a June 26, 2015 release, with Joe Wright as director. The release was pushed back several times including to July 17, 2015 and July 24, 2015, and the studio eventually decided on October 9, 2015, in part to avoid box office competition from summer blockbusters such as Ant-Man and Mission: Impossible – Rogue Nation.

The new release date also gave the producers more time to work on editing and visual effects during post-production. The film was first released in Australia, on September 25, 2015. It was then released in key markets two weeks later, including Germany, Russia, Korea, and Brazil, on October 8. That was followed by Mexico and Spain the next day.

The film opened in the United Kingdom on October 16, 2015, and France on October 21, 2015, followed by China on October 22, 2015, Japan on October 31, 2015, and Italy on November 12, 2015.

Pan was originally planned for an IMAX release, as evident in early posters, trailers, and press, but was cancelled and only received non-IMAX presentations.

Home media
Pan was released on DVD, Blu-ray, and Blu-ray 3D on December 22, 2015, by Warner Home Video,  months after the film's release. Pan was one of the first Ultra HD Blu-rays, released on March 1, 2016.

Reception

Box office
Pan was financially unsuccessful. It grossed $35.1 million in North America and $93.2 million in other territories, for a worldwide total of $128.3 million. In comparison, its production budget was reported to be $150 million, and the total spent on marketing was estimated at $100–125 million.

In the United States and Canada, the film grossed $5.2 million on its opening day. In its opening weekend, the film grossed $15.3 million, below the studio's $20 million projection, and finished third at the box office. Several factors have been attributed to the financial failure of Pan. Forbes blogger Scott Mendelson attributed this to the absence of notable movie stars. Despite the presence of Jackman, "like any number of would-be big stars who are best known for a certain franchise, his opening weekend strength dips when he's not playing his trademark character." Outside of the X-Men films, his biggest openings are Van Helsing ($51 million) and the $27 million debuts of Real Steel and Les Misérables. Variety described the departure of the film in tone and writings that made earlier Peter Pan stories and films a success, from Jackman's role as Blackbeard to the inclusion of contemporary pop songs from Nirvana and the Ramones which is peculiar for a children's film adaptation. "Without the Disney seal of approval, audiences are a bit wary of these fairy tale adaptations," said Jeff Bock, a box office analyst with Exhibitor Relations. He added, "It veered off the Peter Pan path quite extensively and it was just too far left of center for a generation that grew up with Hook and sees that as the definitive account." Warner Bros. declined to discuss Pans box office results.

Pan also struggled internationally, grossing $20.4 million on its opening weekend from 54 markets from over 11,000 screens. 3D comprised 85% of the opening gross. The film was released in Australia on September 24, 2015, to take advantage of the prime September school holidays, where it grossed $1.5 million in its opening weekend. Elsewhere, it opened in the U.K. with $4.1 million, and No. 1 in Mexico ($2.9 million), Brazil ($1.8 million), Indonesia, Malaysia and Thailand and No. 2 in Russia and the CIS with $2 million (behind The Martian), Spain with $1.7 million (behind Regression), Hong Kong, Singapore and the Philippines.

The Hollywood Reporter estimated that the film cost $275 million to produce and market worldwide—while The New York Times reported at least $250 million—and noted that the financial losses by Warner Bros. could finish anywhere between $130 to $150 million. The site suggested that if the film overperformed in China—the world's second largest movie market—the losses could have been lower. Opening in China on October 22, 2015, it failed to meet expectations. Based on its production cost and factoring in the percentage of ticket sales kept by theater owners, analysts estimated that Pan needed to take in at least $400–500 million worldwide to break even. The financial loss incurred by Pan puts it alongside Tomorrowland and Jupiter Ascending as one of the biggest box office failures of 2015.

Critical response
On Rotten Tomatoes, the film has an approval rating of 27% based on 202 reviews and an average rating of 4.60/10. The site's critical consensus reads, "Pan finds a few bursts of magic in its prequel treatment of classic characters, though not enough to offset the rushed plot and shrill, CGI-fueled action." On Metacritic, the film has a score of 36 out of 100 based on 35 critics, indicating "generally unfavorable reviews". Audiences polled by CinemaScore gave the film an average grade of "B+" on an A+ to F scale, while PostTrak reported filmgoers gave it a 78% overall positive score.

A.O. Scott of The New York Times called the action scenes "murky and chaotic" and stated, "The dominant emotion in Pan is the desperation of the filmmakers, who frantically try to pander to a young audience they don’t seem to respect, understand or trust." The main characters lacked chemistry and depth according to Todd McCarthy of The Hollywood Reporter, who added that with the exception of Levi Miller's Pan, "the characters don't reasonably comport with one's pre-existing images of them". He also called a good portion of the film "a seriously extended chase that possesses hefty CGI-propelled dynamics but absolutely no suspense and a very limited sense of fun". Andrew Barker of Variety praised the film's technical achievements and action sequences but found it depressing overall: "Pan swaps puckish mischief and innocence for doses of Steampunk design, anachronistic music, a stock “chosen one” narrative and themes of child labor, warfare and unsustainable mineral mining exchanges".

In a more positive review, Bill Zwecker of Chicago Sun-Times gave the film three out of four stars, calling Levi Miller "a truly wonderful cinematic discovery" and praising the film's "thrilling action sequences, vivid costumes and well-executed special effects".
 
While promoting the film Darkest Hour in 2017, Wright said he almost quit directing and considered retirement following the box office failure of Pan: "I had just made this $100 million flop. It was a dark, difficult time. I didn’t know if I was going to make any more movies, I didn’t know that I wanted to make movies anymore, to be honest."

Accolades

See also
List of biggest box-office bombs
Whitewashing in film

References

External links

 
 
 
 
 

2015 films
2015 3D films
2015 action films
2015 fantasy films
2010s action adventure films
2010s buddy films
2010s children's adventure films
2010s children's fantasy films
2010s fantasy adventure films
American 3D films
American action adventure films
American buddy films
American children's adventure films
American children's fantasy films
American fantasy adventure films
Films about child abduction
Films about fairies and sprites
Films about mermaids
Films directed by Joe Wright
Films produced by Greg Berlanti
Films scored by John Powell
Films set in London
Films shot in Vietnam
Films using motion capture
Peter Pan films
Native American-related controversies in film
Casting controversies in film
Steampunk films
Dune Entertainment films
Warner Bros. films
American World War II films
Films shot at Pinewood Studios
2010s English-language films
2010s American films
American prequel films